The 2019–20 Washington Wizards season was the 59th season of the franchise in the National Basketball Association (NBA) and 47th in the Washington, D.C. area. The Wizards made front office changes, most notably firing former general manager Ernie Grunfeld late last season, replacing him with his longtime assistant, Tommy Sheppard.

The season was suspended by the league officials following the games of March 11 after it was reported that Rudy Gobert tested positive for COVID-19.

On June 4, the Wizards were one of 22 teams invited to the NBA Bubble.

Draft picks

With their sole natural selection of the draft in the first round, the Wizards selected Japanese born power forward Rui Hachimura from Gonzaga University. The team later acquired the rights to the Philadelphia 76ers 42nd pick, small forward Admiral Schofield, in a trade.

Roster

Standings

Division

Conference

Game log

Regular season 

|- style="background:#fcc;"
| 1
| October 23
| @ Dallas
| 
| Bradley Beal (19)
| Thomas Bryant (11)
| Bradley Beal (9)
| American Airlines Center19,816
| 0–1
|- style="background:#cfc;"
| 2
| October 25
| @ Oklahoma City
| 
| Thomas Bryant (21)
| Thomas Bryant (11)
| Ish Smith (5)
| Chesapeake Energy Arena18,203
| 1–1
|- style="background:#fcc;"
| 3
| October 26
| @ San Antonio
| 
| Bradley Beal (25)
| Rui Hachimura (8)
| Bradley Beal (11)
| AT&T Center18,354
| 1–2
|- style="background:#fcc;"
| 4
| October 30
| Houston
| 
| Bradley Beal (46)
| Thomas Bryant (10)
| Isaiah Thomas (10)
| Capital One Arena20,476
| 1–3

|- style="background:#fcc;"
| 5
| November 2
| Minnesota
| 
| Bradley Beal (30)
| Thomas Bryant (10)
| Isaiah Thomas (7)
| Capital One Arena15,150
| 1–4
|- style="background:#cfc;"
| 6
| November 4
| Detroit
| 
| Bradley Beal (26)
| Troy Brown Jr. (10)
| Thomas, Beal (6)
| Capital One Arena13,052
| 2–4
|- style="background:#fcc;"
| 7
| November 6
| @ Indiana
| 
| Bradley Beal (30)
| Thomas Bryant (11)
| Ish Smith (7)
| Bankers Life Fieldhouse16,171
| 2–5
|- style="background:#fcc;"
| 8
| November 8
| Cleveland
| 
| Thomas Bryant (23)
| Bryant, Wagner (8)
| Bradley Beal (9)
| Capital One Arena16,946
| 2–6
|- style="background:#fcc;"
| 9
| November 13
| @ Boston
| 
| Bradley Beal (44)
| Dāvis Bertāns (10)
| Isaiah Thomas (7)
| TD Garden19,156
| 2–7
|- style="background:#cfc;"
| 10
| November 15
| @ Minnesota
| 
| Bradley Beal (44)
| Moritz Wagner (15)
| Bradley Beal (10)
| Target Center12,716
| 3–7
|- style="background:#fcc;"
| 11
| November 17
| @ Orlando
| 
| Bradley Beal (34)
| Dāvis Bertāns (8)
| Bradley Beal (8)
| Amway Center16,344
| 3–8
|- style="background:#cfc;"
| 12
| November 20
| San Antonio
| 
| Bradley Beal (33)
| Rui Hachimura (7)
| Bryant, Thomas (6)
| Capital One Arena14,579
| 4–8
|- style="background:#cfc;"
| 13
| November 22
| Charlotte
| 
| Bradley Beal (30)
| Thomas Bryant (11)
| Bradley Beal (12)
| Capital One Arena15,053
| 5–8
|- style="background:#fcc;"
| 14
| November 24
| Sacramento
| 
| Bradley Beal (20)
| Moritz Wagner (11)
| Bradley Beal (8)
| Capital One Arena15,885
| 5–9
|- style="background:#fcc;"
| 15
| November 26
| @ Denver
| 
| Jordan McRae (21)
| Thomas Bryant (8)
| Bradley Beal (6)
| Pepsi Center18,673
| 5–10
|- style="background:#cfc;"
| 16
| November 27
| @ Phoenix
| 
| Bradley Beal (35)
| Thomas Bryant (9)
| Ish Smith (7)
| Talking Stick Resort Arena14,123
| 6–10
|- style="background:#fcc;"
| 17
| November 29
| @ L. A. Lakers
| 
| Bradley Beal (18)
| Wagner, Hachimura (8)
| Bradley Beal (9)
| Staples Center18,997
| 6–11

|- style="background:#fcc;"
| 18
| December 1
| @ L. A. Clippers
| 
| Rui Hachimura (30)
| Rui Hachimura (9)
| Bradley Beal (11)
| Staples Center19,068
| 6–12
|- style="background:#fcc;"
| 19
| December 3
| Orlando
| 
| Bradley Beal (42)
| Troy Brown Jr. (8)
| Isaiah Thomas (7)
| Capital One Arena13,159
| 6–13
|- style="background:#cfc;"
| 20
| December 5
| Philadelphia
| 
| Rui Hachimura (27)
| Moritz Wagner (11)
| Ish Smith (8)
| Capital One Arena16,554
| 7–13
|- style="background:#fcc;"
| 21
| December 6
| @ Miami
| 
| Bradley Beal (23)
| Dāvis Bertāns (10)
| Smith, Beal (8)
| American Airlines Arena19,600
| 7–14
|- style="background:#fcc;"
| 22
| December 8
| L. A. Clippers
| 
| Dāvis Bertāns (25)
| Rui Hachimura (7)
| Chris Chiozza (6)
| Capital One Arena15,946
| 7–15
|- style="background:#fcc;"
| 23
| December 10
| @ Charlotte
| 
| Dāvis Bertāns (32)
| Rui Hachimura (12)
| Bradley Beal (9)
| Spectrum Center10,626
| 7–16
|- style="background:#fcc;"
| 24
| December 14
| @ Memphis
| 
| Bradley Beal (29)
| Bradley Beal (10)
| Troy Brown Jr. (5)
| FedExForum15,631
| 7–17
|- style="background:#cfc;"
| 25
| December 16
| @ Detroit
| 
| Bradley Beal (35)
| Ian Mahinmi (8)
| Bradley Beal (10)
| Little Caesars Arena14,632
| 8–17
|- style="background:#fcc;"
| 26
| December 18
| Chicago
| 
| Bradley Beal (26)
| Anžejs Pasečņiks (8)
| Bradley Beal (7)
| Capital One Arena14,987
| 8–18
|- style="background:#fcc;"
| 27
| December 20
| @ Toronto
| 
| Bradley Beal (37)
| Dāvis Bertāns (8)
| Bradley Beal (6)
| Scotiabank Arena19,800
| 8–19
|- style="background:#fcc;"
| 28
| December 21
| @ Philadelphia
| 
| Bradley Beal (36)
| Dāvis Bertāns (9)
| Bradley Beal (6)
| Wells Fargo Center20,529
| 8–20
|- style="background:#cfc;"
| 29
| December 23
| @ New York
| 
| Bradley Beal (30)
| Gary Payton II (11)
| Troy Brown Jr. (7)
| Madison Square Garden19,413
| 9–20
|- style="background:#fcc;"
| 30
| December 26
| @ Detroit
| 
| Anžejs Pasečņiks (17)
| Johnathan Williams (8)
| Gary Payton II (5)
| Little Caesars Arena17,188
| 9–21
|- style="background:#fcc;"
| 31
| December 28
| New York
| 
| Thomas, McRae (20)
| Ian Mahinmi (10)
| Isaiah Thomas (4)
| Capital One Arena19,033
| 9–22
|- style="background:#cfc;"
| 32
| December 30
| Miami
| 
| Jordan McRae (29)
| Anžejs Pasečņiks (10)
| Jordan McRae (8)
| Capital One Arena20,476
| 10–22

|- style="background:#fcc;"
| 33
| January 1
| Orlando
| 
| Bradley Beal (27)
| Anžejs Pasečņiks (10)
| Bradley Beal (5)
| Capital One Arena14,921
| 10–23
|- style="background:#fcc;"
| 34
| January 3
| Portland
| 
| Jordan McRae (35)
| Anžejs Pasečņiks (9)
| Ish Smith (5)
| Capital One Arena17,945
| 10–24
|- style="background:#cfc;"
| 35
| January 4
| Denver
| 
| Ish Smith (32)
| Troy Brown Jr. (14)
| Ish Smith (8)
| Capital One Arena16,233
| 11–24
|- style="background:#cfc;"
| 36
| January 6
| Boston
| 
| Ish Smith (27)
| Troy Brown Jr. (9)
| Smith, Mahinmi (4)
| Capital One Arena17,963
| 12–24
|- style="background:#fcc;"
| 37
| January 8
| @ Orlando
| 
| Schofield, Brown Jr. (18)
| Troy Brown Jr. (11)
| Troy Brown Jr. (5)
| Amway Center16,013
| 12–25
|- style="background:#cfc;"
| 38
| January 10
| Atlanta
| 
| Jordan McRae (29)
| Troy Brown Jr. (10)
| Ish Smith (9)
| Capital One Arena16,360
| 13–25
|- style="background:#fcc;"
| 39
| January 12
| Utah
| 
| Bradley Beal (25)
| Isaac Bonga (7)
| Smith, Mahinmi (7)
| Capital One Arena15,953
| 13–26
|- style="background:#fcc;"
| 40
| January 15
| @ Chicago
| 
| Bradley Beal (23)
| Ian Mahinmi (7)
| Ish Smith (5)
| United Center19,382
| 13–27
|- style="background:#fcc;"
| 41
| January 17
| @ Toronto
| 
| Troy Brown Jr. (22)
| Isaac Bonga (10)
| Ish Smith (8)
| Scotiabank Arena19,800
| 13–28
|- style="background:#cfc;"
| 42
| January 20
| Detroit
| 
| Bradley Beal (29)
| Jordan McRae (8)
| Smith, Beal (6)
| Capital One Arena17,305
| 14–28
|- style="background:#fcc;"
| 43
| January 22
| @ Miami
| 
| Bradley Beal (38)
| Ian Mahinmi (10)
| Beal, McRae (5)
| American Airlines Arena19,600
| 14–29
|- style="background:#cfc;"
| 44
| January 23
| @ Cleveland
| 
| Bradley Beal (36)
| Troy Brown Jr. (8)
| Bradley Beal (8)
| Rocket Mortgage FieldHouse16,689
| 15–29
|- style="background:#fcc;"
| 45
| January 26
| @ Atlanta
| 
| Bradley Beal (40)
| Jordan McRae (7)
| Bradley Beal (6)
| State Farm Arena15,567
| 15–30
|- style="background:#fcc;"
| 46
| January 28
| @ Milwaukee
| 
| Bradley Beal (47)
| Thomas Bryant (10)
| Beal, Bryant, Smith (6)
| Fiserv Forum17,681
| 15–31
|- style="background:#cfc;"
| 47
| January 30
| Charlotte
| 
| Bradley Beal (34)
| Bradley Beal (9)
| Bradley Beal (9)
| Capital One Arena15,013
| 16–31

|- style="background:#cfc;"
| 48
| February 1
| Brooklyn
| 
| Bradley Beal (34)
| Thomas Bryant (10)
| Ish Smith (4)
| Capital One Arena18,196
| 17–31
|- style="background:#fcc;"
| 49
| February 3
| Golden State
| 
| Bradley Beal (43)
| Rui Hachimura (8)
| Beal, Smith (6)
| Capital One Arena17,120
| 17–32
|- style="background:#cfc;"
| 50
| February 7
| Dallas
| 
| Bradley Beal (29)
| Dāvis Bertāns (8)
| Bradley Beal (8)
| Capital One Arena20,476
| 18–32
|- style="background:#fcc;"
| 51
| February 9
| Memphis
| 
| Bradley Beal (26)
| Rui Hachimura (11)
| Shabazz Napier (6)
| Capital One Arena17,251
| 18–33
|- style="background:#cfc;"
| 52
| February 11
| Chicago
| 
| Bradley Beal (30)
| Jerome Robinson (9)
| Ish Smith (9)
| Capital One Arena15,135
| 19–33
|- style="background:#cfc;"
| 53
| February 12
| @ New York
| 
| Bradley Beal (30)
| Ian Mahinmi (10)
| Troy Brown Jr. (6)
| Madison Square Garden18,835
| 20–33
|- style="background:#fcc;"
| 54
| February 21
| Cleveland
| 
| Bradley Beal (26)
| Dāvis Bertāns (8)
| Ish Smith (6)
| Capital One Arena18,895
| 20–34
|- style="background:#fcc;"
| 55
| February 23
| @ Chicago
| 
| Bradley Beal (53)
| Rui Hachimura (8)
| Ish Smith (5)
| United Center18,024
| 20–35
|- style="background:#fcc;"
| 56
| February 24
| Milwaukee
| 
| Bradley Beal (55)
| Moritz Wagner (10)
| Napier, Smith (7)
| Capital One Arena16,580
| 20–36
|- style="background:#cfc;"
| 57
| February 26
| Brooklyn
| 
| Bradley Beal (30)
| Thomas Bryant (7)
| Beal, Napier, Smith (5)
| Capital One Arena15,021
| 21–36
|- style="background:#fcc;"
| 58
| February 28
| @ Utah
| 
| Bradley Beal (42)
| Rui Hachimura (7)
| Bradley Beal (10)
| Vivint Smart Home Arena18,306
| 21–37

|- style="background:#cfc;"
| 59
| March 1
| @ Golden State
| 
| Bradley Beal (34)
| Rui Hachimura (8)
| Bradley Beal (8)
| Chase Center18,064
| 22–37
|- style="background:#fcc;"
| 60
| March 3
| @ Sacramento
| 
| Bradley Beal (35)
| Davis Bertans (7)
| Bradley Beal (8)
| Golden 1 Center16,419
| 22–38
|- style="background:#fcc;"
| 61
| March 4
| @ Portland
| 
| Bradley Beal (29)
| Moritz Wagner (9)
| Bradley Beal (6)
| Moda Center19,393
| 22–39
|- style="background:#cfc;"
| 62
| March 6
| Atlanta
| 
| Bradley Beal (35)
| Rui Hachimura (8)
| Shabazz Napier (6)
| Capital One Arena17,856
| 23–39
|- style="background:#fcc;"
| 63
| March 8
| Miami
| 
| Shabazz Napier (27)
| Brown Jr., Hachimura (6)
| Shabazz Napier (7)
| Capital One Arena18,135
| 23–40
|- style="background:#cfc;"
| 64
| March 10
| New York
| 
| Bradley Beal (40)
| Thomas Bryant (10)
| Bradley Beal (7)
| Capital One Arena15,048
| 24–40

|- style="background:#fcc;"
| 65
| July 31
| Phoenix
| 
| Rui Hachimura (21)
| Rui Hachimura (8)
| Ish Smith (7)
| Visa Athletic CenterNo In-Person Attendance
| 24–41
|- style="background:#fcc;"
| 66
| August 2
| @ Brooklyn
| 
| Thomas Bryant (30)
| Thomas Bryant (13)
| Troy Brown Jr. (8)
| HP Field HouseNo In-Person Attendance
| 24–42
|- style="background:#fcc;"
| 67
| August 3
| Indiana
| 
| Thomas Bryant (20)
| Brown Jr., Bryant (7)
| Thomas Bryant (11)
| Visa Athletic CenterNo In-Person Attendance
| 24–43
|- style="background:#fcc;"
| 68
| August 5
| Philadelphia
| 
| Bryant, Robinson (19)
| Thomas Bryant (10)
| Ish Smith (6)
| The ArenaNo In-Person Attendance
| 24–44
|- style="background:#fcc;"
| 69
| August 7
| @ New Orleans
| 
| Rui Hachimura (23)
| Troy Brown Jr. (10) 
| Ish Smith (5)
| Visa Athletic CenterNo In-Person Attendance
| 24–45
|- style="background:#fcc;"
| 70
| August 9
| @ Oklahoma City
| 
| Jerome Robinson (19)
| three players (8)
| Jerome Robinson (6)
| The ArenaNo In-Person Attendance
| 24–46
|- style="background:#fcc;"
| 71
| August 11
| Milwaukee
| 
| Rui Hachimura (20)
| Thomas Bryant (8)
| Jerome Robinson (7)
| Visa Athletic CenterNo In-Person Attendance
| 24–47
|- style="background:#cfc;"
| 72
| August 13
| @ Boston
| 
| Thomas Bryant (26)
| Johnathan Williams (16)
| Ish Smith (8)
| The ArenaNo In-Person Attendance
| 25–47

|- style="background:#;"
| 65
| March 13
| @ Boston
| 
|
|
| 
| TD Garden
|
|- style="background:#;"
| 66
| March 15
| Oklahoma City
| 
|
|
|  
| Capital One Arena
|
|- style="background:#;"
| 67
| March 16
| @ Philadelphia
| 
|
|
| 
| Wells Fargo Center
|
|- style="background:#;"
| 68
| March 18
| @ Brooklyn
| 
|
|
| 
| Barclays Center
|
|- style="background:#;"
| 69
| March 20
| @ Atlanta
| 
|
|
| 
| State Farm Arena
|
|- style="background:#;"
| 70
| March 21
| Milwaukee
| 
|
|
| 
| Capital One Arena
|
|- style="background:#;"
| 71
| March 23
| Boston
| 
|
|
| 
| Capital One Arena
| 
|- style="background:#;"
| 72
| March 25
| Phoenix
| 
|
|
| 
| Capital One Arena
|
|- style="background:#;"
| 73
| March 27
| @ Milwaukee
| 
|
|
| 
| Fiserv Forum
|
|- style="background:#;"
| 74
| March 28
| LA Lakers
| 
|
|
| 
| Capital One Arena
|
|- style="background:#;"
| 75
| April 1
| New Orleans
| 
|
|
| 
| Capital One Arena
|
|- style="background:#;"
| 76
| April 3
| Philadelphia
| 
|
|
| 
| Capital One Arena
|
|- style="background:#;"
| 77
| April 5
| @ Indiana
| 
|
|
|
| Bankers Life Fieldhouse
|
|- style="background:#;"
| 78
| April 7
| Toronto
| 
|
|
|
| Capital One Arena
|
|- style="background:#;"
| 79
| April 10
| @ Houston
| 
|
|
|
| Toyota Center
|
|- style="background:#;"
| 80
| April 11
| @ Charlotte
| 
|
|
|
| Spectrum Center
|
|- style="background:#;"
| 81
| April 13
| @ New Orleans
| 
|
|
| 
| Smoothie King Center
| 
|- style="background:#;"
| 82
| April 15
| Indiana
| 
|
|
|
| Capital One Arena
|

Transactions

Trades

Re-signed

Additions

Subtractions

References

2019-20
2019–20 NBA season by team
2019 in sports in Washington, D.C.
2020 in sports in Washington, D.C.